Air Belgium S.A. is a Belgian scheduled and charter airline headquartered in Mont-Saint-Guibert and based at Brussels Airport.

History

Foundation and early years
In the summer of 2016, the company was started with CEO Niky Terzakis, who worked previously for ASL Airlines Belgium, formerly TNT Airways. The intention was to link Belgium to destinations in Hong Kong, Beijing, Shanghai, Xi'an, Wuhan, Zhengzhou and Taiyuan from its base at Brussels South Charleroi Airport.

The first flight from Brussels to Hong Kong was planned to take off in October 2017, however this was postponed as the airline lacked an air operator's certificate (AOC). In December 2017, Air Belgium announced that the first flight should now take place in March 2018 from Brussels South Charleroi Airport instead of Brussels Airport due to lower airport taxes and easy accessibility; it was also announced that, for business class and premium passengers, the airline would operate from a new dedicated terminal which would be built at the executive terminal, while economy passengers would use the regular terminal.

On 14 March 2018, it was announced that the airline had received its AOC from the Belgian civil aviation authority and planned to begin operating scheduled flights from mid-April. On 29 March 2018, the airline flew its first revenue service by operating its Airbus A340-300 in Air Belgium livery on behalf of Surinam Airways from Amsterdam to Paramaribo. On 25 April 2018, the airline announced a delay to its own inaugural flight (to Hong Kong) from 30 April to 3 June 2018 due to not having the rights to operate in Russian airspace.

Since the commencement of the service for the first destination, it started operating a scheduled service between Charleroi and Hong Kong. Moreover, the other aircraft of the fleet was provided to Air France for a daily service between Paris-Charles de Gaulle and Libreville during the 2018 summer season.

On 21 September 2018, the airline announced that scheduled operations between Charleroi and Hong Kong would be suspended during winter, and the airline would instead focus on charter operations. The route should have restarted at the end of March 2019, but two weeks before the planned date Air Belgium instead announced that they would be terminating the route and working towards starting new services to mainland China in mid-2019 and the Americas in late 2019 or early 2020.

On 16 July 2019, the airline announced plans for flights to Fort de France and Pointe-à-Pitre by December 2019, with further plans to fly to Kinshasa and Miami.

Developments since 2020
On 30 January 2021, Air Belgium announced that cargo flights would start with four Airbus A330-200F based in Liège Airport, on behalf of French shipping company CMA CGM, which purchased the airframes and contracted with Air Belgium to fly them. These four planes are progressively re-immatriculated in France during the 2022-2023 winter.  On 1 July 2021, Air Belgium announced it would add two Airbus A330-900s to its fleet and operate services between Brussels Airport and Mauritius from 15 October 2021.

In November 2022, Air Belgium announced the need of a recapitalisation to avoid bankruptcy after accumulating severe losses. The airline already received €19 million during the same year from its Chinese minority-owners which have been already used up as the airline's primary charter business did not fully recover in the wake of the coronavirus pandemic. The airline subsequently also announced it would cut and suspend several passenger routes. In January 2023, Air Belgium announced that sufficient funding has been secured from private investors to keep operations running while there was no further financial support from the state.

Destinations
, Air Belgium operates or has previously operated scheduled passenger flights to the following destinations:

Fleet

Current fleet
, Air Belgium operates the following aircraft:

Former fleet
The airline previously operated the following aircraft:

See also
List of airlines of Belgium

References

External links

 

Airlines of Belgium
Airlines established in 2016
Companies based in Walloon Brabant
Charter airlines
Belgian companies established in 2016